David Hebbert Boykett OAM (19 August 1934 – 10 February 2016) was an Australian rower who competed in the 1956 Summer Olympics and in the 1964 Summer Olympics. His senior rowing was with the Mercantile Rowing Club in Melbourne where he won several Kings Cups and was later Club President from 1993 to 1997.

In 1956 he was a crew member of the Australian boat which won the bronze medal in the eights event in Melbourne. Eight years later he finished eighth with the Australian boat in the eight competition at Tokyo 1964, after the Australian crew's racing eight shell suffered salt water damage en route to Tokyo. For their race in the Petit (losers') final, the Australian Eight managed to borrow a racing boat from another country's team, and they then won the Petit final with a race time faster than the gold medal-winning time in the Winner's final.

In 2010 he was inducted as a member of the Rowing Victoria Hall of Fame. In 2014 he was awarded a Medal of the Order of Australia for his service to the sport of rowing, including coaching, administration and fundraising.

External links
David Boykett's profile at Sports Reference.com
David Boykett's obituary

1934 births
2016 deaths
Australian male rowers
Olympic rowers of Australia
Rowers at the 1956 Summer Olympics
Rowers at the 1964 Summer Olympics
Olympic bronze medalists for Australia
Olympic medalists in rowing
Medalists at the 1956 Summer Olympics